The Orekhovo-Borisovo Constituency (No.203) is a Russian legislative constituency in Moscow. It is based in Southern Moscow.

Members elected

Election results

1993

|-
! colspan=2 style="background-color:#E9E9E9;text-align:left;vertical-align:top;" |Candidate
! style="background-color:#E9E9E9;text-align:left;vertical-align:top;" |Party
! style="background-color:#E9E9E9;text-align:right;" |Votes
! style="background-color:#E9E9E9;text-align:right;" |%
|-
|style="background-color:"|
|align=left|Irina Khakamada
|align=left|Independent
|62,956
|27.61%
|-
|style="background-color:"|
|align=left|Igor Petrenko
|align=left|Independent
| -
|9.66%
|-
| colspan="5" style="background-color:#E9E9E9;"|
|- style="font-weight:bold"
| colspan="3" style="text-align:left;" | Total
| 228,016
| 100%
|-
| colspan="5" style="background-color:#E9E9E9;"|
|- style="font-weight:bold"
| colspan="4" |Source:
|
|}

1995

|-
! colspan=2 style="background-color:#E9E9E9;text-align:left;vertical-align:top;" |Candidate
! style="background-color:#E9E9E9;text-align:left;vertical-align:top;" |Party
! style="background-color:#E9E9E9;text-align:right;" |Votes
! style="background-color:#E9E9E9;text-align:right;" |%
|-
|style="background-color:#F7C451"|
|align=left|Irina Khakamada (incumbent)
|align=left|Common Cause
|98,835
|33.95%
|-
|style="background-color:"|
|align=left|Anatoly Stankov
|align=left|Independent
|54,165
|18.60%
|-
|style="background-color:"|
|align=left|Iona Andronov
|align=left|Communist Party
|27,060
|9.29%
|-
|style="background-color:#EE2D2A"|
|align=left|Andrey Volkov
|align=left|Block of Djuna
|12,202
|4.19%
|-
|style="background-color:#0032A0"|
|align=left|Valentina Rodionova
|align=left|Cause of Peter the First
|9,637
|3.31%
|-
|style="background-color:#2C299A"|
|align=left|Andrey Shcherbina
|align=left|Congress of Russian Communities
|9,232
|3.17%
|-
|style="background-color:"|
|align=left|Stanislav Terekhov
|align=left|Power to the People!
|8,606
|2.96%
|-
|style="background-color:#DA2021"|
|align=left|Sergey Druganov
|align=left|Ivan Rybkin Bloc
|5,075
|1.74%
|-
|style="background-color:"|
|align=left|Gennady Inzhutov
|align=left|Independent
|4,920
|1.69%
|-
|style="background-color:"|
|align=left|Anton Sorokin
|align=left|Independent
|4,827
|1.66%
|-
|style="background-color:"|
|align=left|Yury Spirin
|align=left|Liberal Democratic Party
|4,695
|1.61%
|-
|style="background-color:#FF8201"|
|align=left|Aleksandr Belyavsky
|align=left|Christian-Democratic Union - Christians of Russia
|4,228
|1.45%
|-
|style="background-color:#D50000"|
|align=left|Yevgeny Kafyrin
|align=left|Communists and Working Russia - for the Soviet Union
|3,623
|1.24%
|-
|style="background-color:#295EC4"|
|align=left|Oleg Tarasenko
|align=left|Party of Economic Freedom
|3,248
|1.12%
|-
|style="background-color:#1093EC"|
|align=left|Sergey Volkov
|align=left|Conservative Party
|2,587
|0.89%
|-
|style="background-color:"|
|align=left|Aram Shegunts
|align=left|Independent
|687
|0.24%
|-
|style="background-color:#000000"|
|colspan=2 |against all
|31,654
|10.87%
|-
| colspan="5" style="background-color:#E9E9E9;"|
|- style="font-weight:bold"
| colspan="3" style="text-align:left;" | Total
| 291,134
| 100%
|-
| colspan="5" style="background-color:#E9E9E9;"|
|- style="font-weight:bold"
| colspan="4" |Source:
|
|}

1998

|-
! colspan=2 style="background-color:#E9E9E9;text-align:left;vertical-align:top;" |Candidate
! style="background-color:#E9E9E9;text-align:left;vertical-align:top;" |Party
! style="background-color:#E9E9E9;text-align:right;" |Votes
! style="background-color:#E9E9E9;text-align:right;" |%
|-
|style="background-color:"|
|align=left|Andrey Nikolaev
|align=left|Independent
|102,862
|64.52%
|-
| colspan="5" style="background-color:#E9E9E9;"|
|- style="font-weight:bold"
| colspan="3" style="text-align:left;" | Total
| 159,427
| 100%
|-
| colspan="5" style="background-color:#E9E9E9;"|
|- style="font-weight:bold"
| colspan="4" |Source:
|
|}

1999

|-
! colspan=2 style="background-color:#E9E9E9;text-align:left;vertical-align:top;" |Candidate
! style="background-color:#E9E9E9;text-align:left;vertical-align:top;" |Party
! style="background-color:#E9E9E9;text-align:right;" |Votes
! style="background-color:#E9E9E9;text-align:right;" |%
|-
|style="background-color:#FF4400"|
|align=left|Andrey Nikolaev (incumbent)
|align=left| Andrey Nikolaev and Svyatoslav Fyodorov Bloc
|56,185
|17.90%
|-
|style="background-color:"|
|align=left|Aleksandr Khinshtein
|align=left|Independent
|50,620
|16.13%
|-
|style="background-color:"|
|align=left|Sergey Ivanov
|align=left|Independent
|31,424
|10.01%
|-
|style="background-color:"|
|align=left|Sergey Ivanenko
|align=left|Yabloko
|29,685
|9.46%
|-
|style="background-color:"|
|align=left|Oleg Sotnikov
|align=left|Independent
|23,481
|7.48%
|-
|style="background-color:#084284"|
|align=left|Natalia Belokhvostikova
|align=left|Spiritual Heritage
|21,692
|6.91%
|-
|style="background-color:#23238E"|
|align=left|Valentina Boykova
|align=left|Our Home – Russia
|15,138
|4.82%
|-
|style="background-color:"|
|align=left|Pyotr Burak
|align=left|Independent
|10,598
|3.38%
|-
|style="background-color:#CC0000"|
|align=left|Vladimir Belyaev
|align=left|Social-Democrats of Russia
|7,473
|2.38%
|-
|style="background-color:"|
|align=left|Yury Kanataev
|align=left|Independent
|6,296
|2.01%
|-
|style="background-color:"|
|align=left|Sergey Novikov
|align=left|Independent
|4,155
|1.32%
|-
|style="background-color:"|
|align=left|Viktor Ryzhov
|align=left|Independent
|2,191
|0.70%
|-
|style="background-color:#000000"|
|colspan=2 |against all
|46,707
|14.88%
|-
| colspan="5" style="background-color:#E9E9E9;"|
|- style="font-weight:bold"
| colspan="3" style="text-align:left;" | Total
| 313,821
| 100%
|-
| colspan="5" style="background-color:#E9E9E9;"|
|- style="font-weight:bold"
| colspan="4" |Source:
|
|}

2003

|-
! colspan=2 style="background-color:#E9E9E9;text-align:left;vertical-align:top;" |Candidate
! style="background-color:#E9E9E9;text-align:left;vertical-align:top;" |Party
! style="background-color:#E9E9E9;text-align:right;" |Votes
! style="background-color:#E9E9E9;text-align:right;" |%
|-
|style="background-color:"|
|align=left|Konstantin Zatulin
|align=left|United Russia
|125,050
|44.36%
|-
|style="background-color:#FFD700"|
|align=left|Andrey Nikolaev (incumbent)
|align=left|People's Party
|53,876
|19.11%
|-
|style="background-color:#7C73CC"|
|align=left|Irina Yermakova
|align=left|Great Russia–Eurasian Union
|16,381
|5.81%
|-
|style="background-color:"|
|align=left|Nikolay Nikolaev
|align=left|Independent
|9,465
|3.36%
|-
|style="background-color:"|
|align=left|Marina Smirnova
|align=left|Liberal Democratic Party
|6,800
|2.41%
|-
|style="background-color:"|
|align=left|Vadim Sukhmansky
|align=left|Independent
|2,316
|0.82%
|-
|style="background-color:#000000"|
|colspan=2 |against all
|61,010
|21.64%
|-
| colspan="5" style="background-color:#E9E9E9;"|
|- style="font-weight:bold"
| colspan="3" style="text-align:left;" | Total
| 283,751
| 100%
|-
| colspan="5" style="background-color:#E9E9E9;"|
|- style="font-weight:bold"
| colspan="4" |Source:
|
|}

2016

|-
! colspan=2 style="background-color:#E9E9E9;text-align:left;vertical-align:top;" |Candidate
! style="background-color:#E9E9E9;text-align:left;vertical-align:top;" |Party
! style="background-color:#E9E9E9;text-align:right;" |Votes
! style="background-color:#E9E9E9;text-align:right;" |%
|-
|style="background-color:"|
|align=left|Lyubov Dukhanina
|align=left|United Russia
|71,537
|42.00%
|-
|style="background-color:"|
|align=left|Aleksandr Medvedev
|align=left|Communist Party
|25,036
|14.70%
|-
|style="background-color:"|
|align=left|Boris Chernyshov
|align=left|Liberal Democratic Party
|15,005
|8.81%
|-
|style="background-color:"|
|align=left|Darya Sorokina
|align=left|A Just Russia
|13,495
|7.92%
|-
|style="background-color:"|
|align=left|Igor Drandin
|align=left|Yabloko
|10,606
|6.23%
|-
|style="background: ;"| 
|align=left|Yulia Misevich
|align=left|The Greens
|7,028
|4.13%
|-
|style="background:;"| 
|align=left|Aleksandr Abramovich
|align=left|Communists of Russia
|5,394
|3.17%
|-
|style="background:;"| 
|align=left|Sergey Yerokhov
|align=left|People's Freedom Party
|5,358
|3.15%
|-
|style="background:"| 
|align=left|Anatoly Polyakov
|align=left|Patriots of Russia
|4,917
|2.89%
|-
|style="background:;"| 
|align=left|Rakhman Yansukov
|align=left|Party of Growth
|3,839
|2.25%
|-
|style="background:;"| 
|align=left|Ibragim Khudayberdiev
|align=left|Rodina
|2,437
|1.43%
|-
| colspan="5" style="background-color:#E9E9E9;"|
|- style="font-weight:bold"
| colspan="3" style="text-align:left;" | Total
| 170,330
| 100%
|-
| colspan="5" style="background-color:#E9E9E9;"|
|- style="font-weight:bold"
| colspan="4" |Source:
|
|}

2021

|-
! colspan=2 style="background-color:#E9E9E9;text-align:left;vertical-align:top;" |Candidate
! style="background-color:#E9E9E9;text-align:left;vertical-align:top;" |Party
! style="background-color:#E9E9E9;text-align:right;" |Votes
! style="background-color:#E9E9E9;text-align:right;" |%
|-
|style="background-color: " |
|align=left|Yevgeny Nifantyev
|align=left|United Russia
|92,484
|38.59%
|-
|style="background-color: " |
|align=left|Vitaly Petrov
|align=left|Communist Party
|46,579
|19.43%
|-
|style="background-color: "|
|align=left|Oleg Kazenkov
|align=left|A Just Russia — For Truth
|17,817
|7.43%
|-
|style="background-color: " |
|align=left|Vasily Petrov
|align=left|Communists of Russia
|16,923
|7.06%
|-
|style="background-color: "|
|align=left|Alisa Smolich
|align=left|New People
|15,001
|6.26%
|-
|style="background-color: " |
|align=left|Yevgeny Turushev
|align=left|Liberal Democratic Party
|12,876
|5.37%
|-
|style="background-color: "|
|align=left|Svetlana Anisimova
|align=left|Russian Party of Freedom and Justice
|10,941
|4.56%
|-
|style="background-color: " |
|align=left|Ilya Gurevich
|align=left|Yabloko
|7,850
|3.28%
|-
|style="background: ;"| 
|align=left|Natalya Shushlebina
|align=left|The Greens
|5,442
|2.27%
|-
|style="background: ;"| 
|align=left|Ksenia Shlyamina
|align=left|Green Alternative
|3,734
|1.56%
|-
|style="background: ;"| 
|align=left|Lev Yudin
|align=left|Civic Platform
|2,679
|1.12%
|-
|style="background-color: " |
|align=left|Pavel Penkin
|align=left|Party of Growth
|2,563
|1.07%
|-
| colspan="5" style="background-color:#E9E9E9;"|
|- style="font-weight:bold"
| colspan="3" style="text-align:left;" | Total
| 239,688
| 100%
|-
| colspan="5" style="background-color:#E9E9E9;"|
|- style="font-weight:bold"
| colspan="4" |Source:
|
|}

Notes

Sources
203. Орехово-Борисовский одномандатный избирательный округ

References

Russian legislative constituencies
Politics of Moscow